The Bishop of Madagascar may refer to:

Anglican Bishop of Madagascar
Greek Orthodox Bishop of Madagascar